Gemmula hindsiana is a species of sea snail, a marine gastropod mollusk in the family Turridae, the turrids.

Description
The length of the shell attains 18 mm.

Distribution
This marine species occurs from the Southwest Baja California, Mexico to Peru

References

 Berry, S. S. (1958). West American molluscan miscellany. II. Leaflets in Malacology, 1(16), 91-98.

External links
 Hinds R. B. (1843). On new species of Pleurotoma, Clavatula, and Mangelia. Proceedings of the Zoological Society of London. 11: 36-46
 Gastropods.com: Gemmula hindsiana
  Tucker, J.K. 2004 Catalog of recent and fossil turrids (Mollusca: Gastropoda). Zootaxa 682:1-1295.

hindsiana
Gastropods described in 1958